Anwar Rasheed is an Indian film director and producer who works in Malayalam films. He made his debut in 2005 with Rajamanikyam.He continued to do successful action-comedy films, such as Chotta Mumbai (2007) and Annan Thambi (2008). His directorial drama Ustad Hotel (2012) won the National Film Award for Best Popular Film Providing Wholesome Entertainment. He has produced commercially successful films like Bangalore Days and Premam under the banner Anwar Rasheed Entertainments.

Career 

Rasheed started his career by assisting director Ranjith in his films. After Ranjith withdrew his decision in directing the film Rajamanikyam, Rasheed was called on to do the same project. Rasheed debuted as a director in 2005 with Rajamanikyam in which Mammootty played the lead role. In 2007, he directed the action-comedy Chotta Mumbai starring Mohanlal in the lead role. It was followed by the action-comedy Annan Thambi (2008), the drama Bridge in Kerala Cafe (2009) and Ustad Hotel (2012), the latter won the National Film Award for Best Popular Film Providing Wholesome Entertainment. In 2013, Anwar directed the segment Aami in the anthology film 5 Sundarikal. His latest movie as a director is Trance, starring Fahadh Faasil. Anwar also produced the movie under his banner 'Anwar Rasheed Entertainments'.

Filmography

As director

As producer

References

External links 
 

Artists from Kollam
Living people
Malayalam film directors
Malayalam film producers
1976 births
Film directors from Kerala
21st-century Indian film directors
Film producers from Kerala
Directors who won the Best Popular Film Providing Wholesome Entertainment National Film Award